FK Fayzkand Hulbuk ,(), is a football club based in Hulbuk in Tajikistan.

History
FK Fayzkand earned promotion to the Tajikistan Higher League for the first time in 2019, after finishing second in the 2019 Tajikistan First League.

On 24 March 2020, FK Fayzkand announced Tokhirjon Muminov as their new manager.

Domestic history

Current squad
''

References

External links

Football clubs in Tajikistan